The .220 Rook, also known as the .220 Long Centrefire, is an obsolete British centerfire rifle cartridge.

Overview
The .220 Rook is a rimmed cartridge originally designed for use in rook rifles, it was designed and produced in Britain in the 1880s.  It is believed to be an early centrefire version of the .22 Long Rifle rimfire cartridge.

See also
List of rifle cartridges
5 mm rifle cartridges

References

Pistol and rifle cartridges
British firearm cartridges
Rook rifle cartridges